Anabond  is the registered brand name of products manufactured by Anabond Limited, a company headquartered in Thiruvanmiyur, Chennai, India. It manufactures engineering adhesives and sealants which are used in automobile and engineering product manufacturing, electrical and electronic products manufacturing and maintenance of these equipments. Anabond was the first company in India to manufacture anaerobic adhesives and sealants.

Anabond was established by J.Vijayakumar scientist from the Indira Gandhi Centre for Atomic Research (IGCAR), Kalpakkam in 1979 after he resigned from IGCAR. Now it has over 500 people working in various functions. It has fully dedicated R&D centre at Perungudi, Chennai and production facilities in Chennai, Puducherry and Assam . The R&D centre carries out research in different areas such as anaerobic adhesives (anaerobic sealants), epoxies, silicone sealants, and rubber-based adhesives. They also joined their hands with Indian Space Research Organisation and Defence Research and Development Organisation in developing products for them to be used in their space and missile programmes.

Anabond has 16 branches, 75 executives and 300 direct selling agents across India which covers the country and takes care of the customer requirements. Backed by an Application Development Centre (A.D.C) at Chennai, Anabond believes that their 40 plus years of experience in Adhesives and sealant research can give the winning edge to their users. They believe that there is a simple chemical solution to every engineering problem. Anabond products have already been approved by major users in India and abroad. Anabond products are exported to Germany, United Kingdoms, the middle east countries and Most parts of Asia.
The company has also set up a joint venture with Stedman for manufacturing dental composites. A 50:50 Joint venture with M/S.H.S.Butyl Limited, Lymington, U.K has paved way for the formation of Anabond  H.S.Butyl Pvt. Ltd to manufacture Butyl tapes for the Indian market. 
There are 16 dedicated scientists, 16 chemists and 8 supporting staff working towards developing various grades of adhesives, sealants, encapsulants, paints & speciality coating materials based on different types of polymeric systems such as epoxies, polyurethanes, silicones, acrylics, synthetic elastomers etc. Being an environmentally responsible company the present research is on producing safe and sustainable adhesives from renewable raw materials.

References

External links
Official Website
Waterproof Glue

Adhesives
Manufacturing companies established in 1979
Indian companies established in 1979
Manufacturing companies based in Chennai
1979 establishments in Tamil Nadu